Agnes Water is a coastal town and a locality in the Gladstone Region, Queensland, Australia.

Geography
It is accessed via the main road called Round Hill Road. It is 90 minutes south of Gladstone, and 90 minutes north of Bundaberg on the Discovery Coast. Agnes Water is the closest access point to the southern Great Barrier Reef. It is a neighbouring town of the Town of 1770.

Much of the area's natural beauty has been preserved through the establishment of Eurimbula National Park, covering more than 23,000 hectares and the nearby Joseph Banks Environmental Park, located on the headland originally known as Round Head.

History
Prior to European settlement Agnes Water was home to the Meerooni tribe who form the southern part of the Gurang nation.

The town of Agnes Water takes its name from pastoral holding first leased by Daniel Clowes in 1883, which he named after the coastal schooner Agnes, which was lost at sea in the area. The schooner left Bustard Head on 15 June 1873, en route from Mackay to Brisbane.

Daniel Clowes remained there until his death in 1891. The gravestones of Clowes and his wife are near the present township.

There was saw milling in the locality in the 1890s and the wide beach was a popular venue, particularly as buggies could be driven onto the beach. It became a holiday destination, and weekend residences were built, notably on Round Hill where the Town of 1770 was officially named in 1936. However, the town was regarded as somewhat remote, and it was not until the road into the town was completely sealed in the mid-1990s that development really took off.

Agnes Water State School was opened on 29 January 1990.

Agnes Tavern  opened in 1993.

The current Agnes Water Public Library opened in 2011 and had a minor refurbishment in 2016.

This figure is made up of 942 males and 872 females with a median age of 41. The town's most common ancestries are English (32.4%), Australian (29.6%), Scottish (8.6%), Irish (7.8%) and German (4.8%).

Discovery Christian College opened in 2015.

Goora Gan Steiner School opened in January 2017.

In 2018, Agnes Water became the first cryptocurrency town. Shops, hotels accept cryptocurrency - Bitcoin, Litecoin, Ethereum and NEM.

Religion
The area of Agnes Water has two local churches - the Agnes Water Baptist Church and the Catholic Church. Both are located on Bicentennial Dve, a short drive from the centre of the area. Census data from 2011 shows that 32.3% of the population do not identify with a religion while 19.6% list Anglican as their religion, followed by Catholicism (16.1%).

Education

Agnes Water State School is a government primary (Prep-6) school for boys and girls at 1 Donohue Drive. In 2017, the school had an enrolment of 215 students with 19 teachers (15 full-time equivalent) and 14 non-teaching staff (8 full-time equivalent).

Goora Gan Steiner School is a private primary (Prep-6) school for boys and girls at 71 Springs Road. In 2017, the school had an enrolment of 12 students with 2 teachers and 1 non-teaching staff.

Discovery Christian College is a private primary and secondary (Prep-12) school for boys and girls at 2873 Round Hill Road. In 2017, the school had an enrolment of 160 students with 18 teachers (15 full-time equivalent) and 12 non-teaching staff (5 full-time equivalent).

Only 7.1% of the population during the  listed their education level as being over secondary school (i.e. tertiary or further education).

Facilities

The town has a visitor information centre on Round Hill Road. The town also hosts a community centre, coastal camping reserve, life-saving club, state primary school (1990), and a museum which houses the Miriam Vale Historical Society. The Agnes Water Library is at 71 Springs Road and is operated by the Gladstone Regional Council.

The local tourism and commerce group has created a website listing the natural attractions and all things to do while visiting the region.

The Agnes Water Ambulance station has 5 paramedics. The officer-in-charge Brett Schultz has served the Agnes Community for over ten years.

Creative Community 
Agnes Water has become the home of many in the creative community. The community has a significant population who came to Agnes to heal and stayed. The town is well represented creatively and visitors can partake in Art and Cultural Trails and visit the 1770 Art Show. The town is also the inspiration behind the song "Sweet Agnes"  released in 2022 by the band Railmotor The album was recorded in Agnes Water over two weeks in May, 2022.

Beaches and fishing
The beach is relatively straight and faces east-north-east. Most of the beach is backed by a low dune and natural vegetation. At the southern Agnes Water end there is an extensive foreshore reserve, including a camping reserve. The beach usually receives waves averaging about one metre, which combine with the medium sand to build a moderately steep high tide beach, with a continuous bar exposed at low tide. During and following higher swell, up to 30 rip channels are cut across the lower section of the bar and an outer bar forms along the central and northern sections of the beach. The rip channels will persist for some weeks during lower wave conditions. As well as the surf beach, Agnes Water is intersected by rocky headlands and has a stream behind the coastline. A relatively safe beach is located in the southern patrolled area.

Region highlights 
Agnes Water is predominantly a tourist region that relies on the constant flow of visitors including families that visit the area in peak school holiday seasons and grey nomads that add to the local population in the months from May to September each year.

The bulk of local businesses are built around typical town needs and servicing the demands of visitors, with operators such as 1770 LARC! Tours and Scooteroos.

Agnes Water has a significantly high proportion of hospitality services per capita to meet the demand of local visitors.

Agnes Water is also home to one of Australia's most highly awarded tea companies, Tielka.

References

External links

 

Towns in Queensland
Coastal towns in Queensland
Seaside resorts in Australia
Gladstone Region
Localities in Queensland